Several vessels of the Royal Navy have been named HMS Nimble.

  was a 12-gun cutter that was wrecked in 1781 with the loss of 28 men.
  was a purchased 12-gun cutter that ran aground in 1808 in Stangate Creek in the Medway and was then sold.
  was a Nimble-class 10-gun cutter commissioned wrecked during a violent storm in the Kattegat on 6 October 1812. 
  was a new cutter that the Royal Navy purchased in 1813. The Navy sold her in 1816. 
 HMS Nimble whose crew dislodged the Logan Rock whilst stationed off Land's End in April 1824.
  was a 5-gun schooner employed off Cuba in the suppression of the slave trade until she was wrecked on 4 November 1834. 
  was a gunvessel of 5 guns that had a relatively uneventful career before she became a drill ship for the Royal Naval Reserve in 1890 and was disposed of in 1906.
  was a rescue tug launched in 1942 and sold in 1968.

Related vessels
There was a revenue cutter Nimble, of Deal, that the French captured and that became the French privateer Dunqerquois. The hired armed cutter  destroyed her on 5 March 1808.

Citations

References
 
 
 
  

Royal Navy ship names